Thrixspermum centipeda, commonly called the centipede thrixspermum, is a species of orchid widespread across southern China, the Himalayas, Indochina, Malaysia, Indonesia and the Philippines.

References

centipeda
Orchids of Asia
Plants described in 1790